Zhang Wannian (1 August 1928 – 14 January 2015) was a general of the People's Liberation Army (PLA) of the People's Republic of China.

Biography

Zhang Wannian was born in Huang County (now Longkou), Shandong Province of China on 1 August 1928.

He joined the Eighth Route Army in August 1944 and the Communist Party of China (CPC) in August 1945. 

From 1958 to 1961, he studied in the preparatory and basic department at the Nanjing Military Academy of PLA. From 1962-1966, he was the head of the 367th regiment, affiliated to the 123rd division of 41st Army. From 1966-1968, he was the vice director in the battle department in the headquarters of Guangzhou Military Region. From 1968-1978, he was the head of 127 division of 43rd Army. From 1978-1981, he was the vice head of 43rd Army and head of 127th Division. He was studying at PLA Military Academy from 1978-79. He led the 127th Division of the 43rd Corps during the 1979 Sino-Vietnamese border war. From 1981-82, he was the head of 43rd Corps. From 1982-85, he was the vice commander in Wuhan Military Region.

From 1985-87, he was the vice commander of Guangzhou Military Region, and became the commander and vice secretary of CPC's committee there in 1987 till 1990. From 1990-92, he was the commander of Jinan Military Region, and vice secretary of CPC committee there.

In 1992, he became a member of CPC's central military commission and the director as well as the secretary of the party of the General Staff Department of PLA. In September 1995, he was elevated to vice-Chairman of the CMC (Central Military Commission), along with Chi Haotian. As expected, both were elected as the executive vice Chairmen of the CMC at the Fifteenth Party Congress in 1997. He was soon promoted to the Politburo as well as the Chinese Communist Party Secretariat. He attended the changeover ceremonies in Hong Kong in 1997 as the sole senior military representative (Vice-Chairman of the Central Military Commission), indicating his preeminent position in the military.

He was a deputy to CPC's 9th National Congress, and an alternative member of 12th and 13th CPC's central committee. He became an alternate member of the 12th and 13th and a member of the 14th and 15th CPC's Central Committees, and a Politburo member and Secretary of the Secretariat in 15th central committee.

He was awarded Third-Class Liberation Medal, and has achieved Great Honors five times. When he visited Pakistan in September 1993, he was awarded a military medal by the President.

He was promoted to lieutenant general in September 1988, and to general in June 1993. He retired in 2003.

He was married to Zhong Peizhao.

References

1928 births
People's Liberation Army generals from Shandong
2015 deaths
Politicians from Yantai
People's Liberation Army Chiefs of General Staff
Commanders of the Guangzhou Military Region
Members of the 15th Politburo of the Chinese Communist Party
Chinese Communist Party politicians from Shandong
People's Republic of China politicians from Shandong
People of the Republic of China
Burials at Babaoshan Revolutionary Cemetery